Lindenwood Neighborhood Historic District is a national historic district located at St. Charles, St. Charles County, Missouri, United States. The district encompasses 108 contributing buildings and 1 contributing site in an exclusively residential section of St. Charles. It developed between about 1902 and 1956, and includes representative examples of Queen Anne, Folk Victorian, Colonial Revival, Tudor Revival, Mediterranean Revival, and Bungalow / American Craftsman style architecture.

It was added to the National Register of Historic Places in 2016.

References

Historic districts on the National Register of Historic Places in Missouri
Queen Anne architecture in Missouri
Victorian architecture in Missouri
Colonial Revival architecture in Missouri
Mediterranean Revival architecture in Missouri
Tudor Revival architecture in Missouri
Bungalow architecture in Missouri
Buildings and structures in St. Charles County, Missouri
National Register of Historic Places in St. Charles County, Missouri